Mamie Phipps Clark (April 18, 1917–August 11, 1983) was an African-American social psychologist who, along with her husband Kenneth Clark, focused on the development of self-consciousness in black preschool children. Clark was born and raised in Hot Springs, Arkansas. Clark received her post-secondary education at Howard University, and she earned her bachelor's and master's degrees there.

For her master's thesis, known as "The Development of Consciousness of Self in Negro Pre-School Children," Clark worked with black Arkansas preschool children. This work included doll experiments that investigated the way African American children's attitudes toward race and racial self-identification were affected by segregation. According to the study, children who attended segregated schools preferred playing with white dolls over black dolls. The study was highly influential in the Brown v. Board of Education court case. It shed light on the effects of racial segregation on school-age children. Clark's experiences with segregation led her to become a civil rights activist in her community and provide for the youth.

Early life
Born on April 18, 1917, in Hot Spring, Arkansas, Mamie Phipps Clark attended highly segregated schools, including a Catholic elementary school. Phipps's father, Harold H. Phipps, born in the British West Indies, was a well-respected physician and a manager of a resort. Though Katy Florence Phipps, Phipps's mother, was a homemaker, she was often involved in her husband's work as a physician. Her younger brother became a dentist.

Mamie Phipps Clark described her elementary and secondary education as deficient in substantive areas. However, although her school was racially segregated, she retrospectively commented that the combined experience of segregation and a supportive, extended family shaped her career satisfaction later in life. Her mother did not need to work to supplement the family income. Clark stated: 

Clark graduated from Langston High School, even though it was very uncommon for a black student to do so. She received two offers and scholarships from black prestigious universities, Fisk University and Howard University. She enrolled at Howard in 1934. Despite her attending college during the Great Depression, her father was able to send her $50 per month. She majored in math and minored in physics. It was highly unusual for black women to receive an education in those departments at the time.

At Howard University, Mamie Phipps Clark met her future husband, Kenneth Bancroft Clark, who was a master's degree student in psychology. It was Kenneth Clark who urged her to pursue psychology because it would allow her to explore her interest in working with children. Phipps once stated "I'd always had an interest in children. Always from the time I was very small. I'd always thought I wanted to work with children, and psychology seemed a good field." Mamie Phipps Clark and Kenneth Bancroft Clark eloped during her senior year in 1937. In 1938, Mamie Phipps Clark graduated magna cum laude from Howard University. After she immediately enrolled in Howard University's psychology graduate program. For her master's thesis, she studied when black children became aware of themselves as having a distinct “self,” as well as when they became aware of belonging to a particular racial group. She defined “race consciousness” as the perception of self-belonging to a specific group, which is differentiated from other groups by obvious physical characteristics. Her conclusions about African American children became the foundation and the guiding premise for the famous doll studies which her and her husband would later become very well known for. Phipps confessed that it was not until the end of her undergraduate years that she finally became confident about creating solutions for segregation and racial oppression. The summer after her graduation Phipps worked as a secretary in the law office of Charles Houston, who was a prominent lawyer and leading civil rights figure at a time when segregation cases were being taken up by the national Association for the Advancement Colored People legal defense fund. There she witnessed the work of William Hastie, Thurgood Marshall, and others in preparation for the court challenges that would lead to the landmark 1954 decision Brown v. Board of Education. As she later noted: "I can't even remember the names of them all, but they converged in his office to prepare these cases and that was the most marvelous learning experience I ever had- in the whole sense of really, blasphemy, to blacks, was brought very clearly to me in that office." This had an influence on her master's thesis, "The Development of Consciousness of Self in Negro Pre-School Children," which would later be responsible for the research and experiments which influenced the Supreme Court Case, Brown v. Board of Education.

Clark was the first Black woman to earn her Ph.D. in experimental psychology, which she did in 1943 from Columbia University. She returned to student life with the vivid and optimistic idea that an “actual tangible approach” could be used to further her research and findings about African American children. Phipps Clark's dissertation adviser was Henry E. Garrett, later president of the American Psychological Association. He is noted as an exceptional statistician but also an open racist. Later on in her career, she was asked to testify in the Prince Edward County, Virginia, desegregation case in order to rebut his testimony offered in that court in support of inherent racial differences.

After graduation, she experienced a lot of frustration career-wise. She attributed this to the “unwanted anomaly” of being a Black woman in a field dominated by white males. One instrumental role was a job in 1945 conducting psychological testing for homeless black girls for the Riverdale Home for Children. Here, she created and carried out psychological tests, as well as counseling homeless African Americans and other minority children in New York City: "I think Riverdale had a profound effect on me, because I was never aware that there were that many children who were just turned out you know, or whose parents had just left them, so to speak."   This spurred her desire to open the Northside Child Development Center.

Doll study
Phipps Clark's doll study was a continuation of the work she did for her master's thesis. It was inspired by Ruth and Gene Horowitz's work on “self-identification” in nursery school children. Her master's thesis spurred her husband's interests in the area and served as the basis of their later collaborative work on the racial preferences of Black children. She opted not to publish her thesis because she thought it was exploitative to publish with a professor. She reportedly told her husband that they would do it together.

The experiment played a key role as evidence in the court challenge that led to the Supreme Court's Brown v. Board of Education decision in 1954, by proving that segregation caused psychological harm to children. Mamie Phipps Clark had conducted the experiment with her husband, Kenneth, 14 years earlier. Findings from this study were the first social science research to be submitted as hard evidence in the Court's history.

The study used four dolls identical in all ways except color. It was administered to children ages 3–7, asking questions to identify racial perception and preference. The following questions were asked:

The experiment revealed a preference for the white doll for all of the questions and attributed positive attributes to the white dolls. The Clarks concluded that "prejudice, discrimination and segregation" caused black children to develop a sense of inferiority and self-hatred. Phipps Clark concluded, “If society says it is better to be White not only White people but Negroes come to believe it. And a child may try to escape the trap of inferiority by denying the fact of his own race.” The original experiment led the way to other experiments conducted by Phipps Clark and her husband. Phipps Clark interviewed three hundred children from different parts of the county where schools were segregated and found the same results.

As part of the doll experiment, Phipps Clark also gave the children outlines of a boy and a girl and told them to color the outlines the same color as themselves. Many of the black children colored themselves white or yellow.

The conclusion of the doll tests and the segregation tests demonstrated that segregation in schools affect children negatively. The study used identical dolls; the only difference was the skin tone of the doll.

Additional research
Mamie and her husband conducted multiple studies prior to their famous doll study. In 1939, they conducted a study to determine when self consciousness, specifically racial consciousness develops in African American children. Segregated African American children ages 3–5 years were given line drawings of white and colored boys, along with line drawings of different animals. Children were then asked to identify which picture described themselves or someone close to them. The results of their study showed that some 3-year-old children chose animals to describe themselves, while 4-year-old children never did. This suggests that around the age of 4, children begin to understand that they are distinctly human which the researchers suggest develops before children understand that they are a part of certain groups of individuals. In addition, the study found that children begin to identify themselves as white or colored around the same age. There was an increase in colored identification in the 4-year-old children compared to the 3-year-old children, however, this trend was not significant between 4 and 5-year-old children. The researchers did not believe that children stop continuing their racial identity development at age 5, but they suggested that their way of measuring this was not advanced enough to capture this development.
Mamie and her husband's work allowed future researchers to use similar methodology and expand on the couple's research. Jensen and Tisak (2020) cited the Clark's study and used a similar methodology to find that white preschoolers preferred white girls and non white preschoolers preferred non white girls, expanding on the idea that young children racially identifying themselves, adding that children prefer others that fit their racial identity.

The Northside Center for Child Development
In February 1946, Mamie Phipps Clark founded the Northside Center for Child Development in the basement of the Paul Lawrence Dunbar apartments, where her family lived. It was funded by a loan of $946 from Mamie's father, Harold Phipps. First called the Northside Testing and Consultation Center, it became the Northside Center for Child Development in 1948. Northside was the first center to provide therapy for children in Harlem, as well as providing support to families who needed housing assistance.

The prevailing therapeutic approach at the time was psychoanalysis. However, the Clarks dismissed the effectiveness of psychoanalysis with the population served by the center. They felt the center had to provide what was identified as missing for their clients and preferred a more comprehensive holistic approach.

The center later expanded its services to include psychological consultations for behavior problems due to emotional disturbances, vocational guidance for adolescents, education in child training for Black parents, and various psychological testing. Today services include remedial reading and math tutoring, nutritional workshops, and parental training. Clark remained active as the director of Northside until her retirement in 1979.

Harlem Youth Opportunities Unlimited project (HARYOU)
She continued to collaborate with her husband on numerous projects, including the Harlem Youth Opportunities Unlimited project (HARYOU), to provide education and employment opportunities for the youth in Harlem. It was established in 1962 with the help of Kenneth Clark and other community leaders. HARYOU provided corrective/remedial education for impoverished youth who were falling behind in school, provided job opportunities for Black youth, and taught residents how to work with government agencies to obtain funds and services. Kenneth Clark proposed busing to integrate schools, but protests from parents on both sides prevented fruition. HARYOU later merged with Associated Community Teams as part of Lyndon B. Johnson's War on Poverty initiative. It was renamed HARYOU-ACT. The Clark's involvement with the agency was short-lived due to political conflicts. Kenneth Clark published conclusions from work with HARYOU in a book called Dark Ghetto (1965).

Personal life
Mamie Phipps and Kenneth Clark married in 1937. Mamie Clark said that the collaboration between her and her husband resulted in “a lifetime of close, challenging and professionally satisfying experiences”. The Clarks were married for 45 years until Mamie Clark's death on August 11, 1983. She died at the age of 66, leaving behind two children, Kate Harris and Hilton Clark.

Clark was very active in her community. She served as chairman of a housing company that built apartments in NYC. She also served on the board of the American Broadcasting Companies, the Museum of Modern Art, the New York Public Library, New York Mission Society, The Phelps Stokes Fund, Teachers College at Columbia University, and was a Commissioner of the Palisades Interstate Park Commission. Additionally, she served with advisory groups including the National Headstart Planning Committee.

Legacy
Clark's work on the impact of racial discrimination and stereotypes provided important contributions to the field of developmental psychology and the psychology of race. She worked as a research psychologist for the United States Armed Forces Institute and the Public Health Association. Her effort on the identity and self-esteem of Black people expanded the work on identity development.

Clark is not as famous as her husband. It is noted that Phipps Clark’s recognition and the legacy of her contribution to the academic research world remains diminished today. Dr. Phipps Clark faced both gendered and racial obstacles in her career yet continued to work despite the challenges of intersectionality in the psychological field. It has been noted that she adhered to feminine expectations of the time and often took care to "remain in the shadows of her husband's limelight". She often presented as shy. She has been praised for achieving success professionally while maintaining the satisfaction of a fulfilling home life. She received a Candace Award for Humanitarianism from the National Coalition of 100 Black Women in 1983.

Clark died of cancer on August 11, 1983, at 66 years of age.

See also 
 Kenneth and Mamie Clark

References

Additional references
 City College of New York Libraries. (n.d.). Toward Humanity and Racial Justice: The Legacy of Dr. Kenneth B. Clark [Children, Families and the Northside Center for Child Development: A Lasting Legacy in Harlem. 
 City College of New York Libraries. (n.d.). Toward Humanity and Racial Justice: The Legacy of Dr. Kenneth B. Clark [Black is Beautiful: The Doll Study and Racial Preferences and Perceptions.  
 "Clark, Mamie Phipps." Complete Dictionary of Scientific Biography. 2008 
 Guthrie, R. V. (1998). Even the rat was white: A historical view of psychology (2nd ed.) Pearson Education, Upper Saddle River, NJ.
 Karera, A. (2010). Profile of Mamie Phipps Clark. In A. Rutherford (Ed.), Psychology's Feminist Voices Multimedia
 
 Severo, r. (2005, May 2), Kenneth Clark, Who Fought Segregation, Dies 
 Smothers, R. (1983, August 12), Mamie Clark Dies; Psychologist aided Blacks
 The National Association for the Advancement of Colored People Legal Defense and Education Fund, Inc. Brown at 60: The doll test

1917 births
1983 deaths
African-American psychologists
American women psychologists
20th-century American psychologists
People from Hot Springs, Arkansas
Howard University alumni
20th-century African-American women
20th-century African-American people
20th-century American people